Marivita geojedonensis is a Gram-negative, aerobic, rod-shaped, non-spore-forming and non-motile bacterium from the genus of Marivita which has been isolated from seawater from the South Sea in Korea.

References 

Rhodobacteraceae
Bacteria described in 2013